Shiny Benjamin, (also known Shiny Jacob Benjamin born in Karavaloor, Punalur, Kollam) is a National Award-winning Indian director of documentaries and docufictions, from Trivandrum, Kerala.

Life
Shiny Benjamin began her career as journalist, and had been a documentary director since 1999. She worked as a feature writer with the Malayalam newspapers Malayala Manorama and Mathrubhumi before joining Asianet (TV channel), the first Malayalam satellite television channel. Later, she worked with Indiavision, the first news channel in Malayalam, as a chief producer for the television channel JaiHind TV and Jaihind Middle East. Shiny is the younger daughter of K.O.Benjamin and Sosamma Benjamin. Her education began at Karavaloor AMMHS and continued at St. Gorety Girls High School, followed by St. John's College, Anchal. She has been honoured with 20 awards including five National Awards and eight Kerala State Film Awards for documentaries and docufictions.

Filmography

Film festivals

2011 - MIFF Mumbai International Film Festival
2014 -11th Indian film festival, Stuttgart, Germany
2010 - IDSFK Competition Section, Thiruvananthapuram
2009 - SiGNS Film Festival for Short and Documentary films organized by Federation of Film Societies of India
2016 - International Film Festival of India
2016 - 64th International Film Festival (Delhi)
2016 - Pacific Meridian International Film Festival
2016 - Moscow Indian Film Festival, Moscow
2016 - Hindu Lit for Life, Chennai.
2016 - Kerala Literature Festival
2017 - Women’s Film Festival
2017 - Soorya Festival
2017 - Thasarak Literary Festival, Dubai
2017 - Sharjah International Film Festival for Children & Youth (sicff)
2017 - Mathrubhumi International Festival of Letters
2018 - International Documentary & Short Film Festival of Kerala
2018 - Women’s Film Festival
2018 - International Film Festival of India
2018 - Kolkata International Film Festival
2019 - Kerala Literature Festival
2019 - Soorya Festival
2019 - Mathrubhumi International Festival of Letters
2019 - Krithi Knowledge Festival
2019 - Kochi-Muziris Biennale

Awards
 2017 -  The Sword of Liberty Kerala State Awards for the Best Documentary and Best Director
 2017 - The Sword of Liberty National Film Award for Best Historical Reconstruction/Compilation Film.
 2017 - National Film Award for the Best Biographical Film / Best Historical Reconstruction. (Non feature - Biographical Film)
 2017 - National Film Award for the Best Music Direction-Background score. (Non feature - Biographical Film)
 2014 - Translated Lives - A Migration Revisited Best Documentary Film Award at the 3rd Kolkata Shorts International Film Festival.
 2014 - Translated Lives - A Migration Revisited The Laadly National Media Award for Gender Sensitivity.
 2014 -  In Return: Just a Book 64th for the Best Audiography to Ajith Abraham George.
 2010 - Ottayal (One Woman Alone) National Film Awards for the Best Documentary.
 2010 - Ottayal (One woman lone) Kerala State Award for Best Documentary.
 2010 - Ottayal (One woman lone) Special Jury Award John Abraham International Festival for Documentaries and Short Films (Signs) & The Laadly National Media Award.
 2006 - Bhagya, Singer in a Democracy Kerala State Award for Best Documentary.
 2005 - Nizhalukal (Shadows) Kerala State Award for Best Documentary.
 2004 - Mazha (Rain) Kerala State Special Jury Award for Documentary.
 2003 - Avan (He) Kerala State Award for Best Documentary. & Kerala Film Critics Award for Best Documentary and Best Director.
 2002 - Namukkum Avarkkum Idayil (In Between) Kerala State Award for Best Documentary on Topical Issues & Kerala Film Critics Award for Best Documentary and Best Director.
 2001 - Murivunangatha Balyangal (Wounded Childhood) Kerala State Special Jury Film Award for Best Documentary.

References

External links

Indian documentary filmmakers
21st-century Indian film directors
1971 births
Living people
Malayali people
Film directors from Kerala